Kim Dong-soo, (born 1 March 1981) or Garimto, is a South Korean former professional StarCraft player. He now commentates and is in charge of marketing in South Korea for the clothing brand Undefeated.

He is one of only seven players to win the Ongamenet Starleague (OSL) twice. Garimto and was nicknamed "The Zealot", and was notable for succeeding even during Boxer's height of dominance when many Protoss players struggled. He also innovated heavily with Protoss build-orders, making frequent use of "hidden" tech buildings and other tricks. Garimto had to quit professional StarCraft in order to do his Korean military service, but now regularly acts as a commentator for games. In his commentary he is known for criticizing current Protoss players for playing sloppily and hence not achieving the potential of the race. Garimto completed his military service in the Republic of Korea Army on December 21, 2006, and rejoined the e-sports competition as part of KTF, but retired from professional gaming after playing only one game, a loss to Free during the 2nd half of Shinhan Proleague 2007. He briefly returned to professional gaming in January 2007 after joining KTF MagicNs.

Tournament results 
 1st — 2000 Freechall OnGameNet Starleague
 1st — 2001 SKY OnGameNet Starleague

See also
 StarCraft professional competition

References

Living people
South Korean esports players
StarCraft players
1981 births